Arnasoy is a district of Jizzakh Region in Uzbekistan. The capital lies at the town Gʻoliblar.

The district consists of two urban-type settlements (Gʻoliblar, Gulbahor) and 6 rural communities.

References 

Districts of Uzbekistan
Jizzakh Region